Philip Bo Samuelsson (born July 26, 1991) is a Swedish-American professional ice hockey defenceman for Fischtown Pinguins of the Deutsche Eishockey Liga (DEL). Samuelsson was drafted in the second round, 61st overall, of the 2009 NHL Entry Draft by the Pittsburgh Penguins. He is the son of two-time Penguins Stanley Cup winner, Ulf Samuelsson.

Background
Samuelsson was born in Leksand, Sweden, and raised in the United States where his father played in the National Hockey League (NHL) until 2000.  As a youth, he played in the 2004 Quebec International Pee-Wee Hockey Tournament with the Philadelphia Flyers minor ice hockey team. Samuelsson played at Avon Old Farms in 2005–06, and two season for PF Changs of the Midwest Elite Hockey League while living in Scottsdale, Arizona where his father was an assistant coach for the Phoenix Coyotes. His younger brother Henrik currently plays for Manchester Storm in the EIHL.

Playing career
He began playing junior hockey with the US National Development Program before joining the Chicago Steel of the USHL in 2008–09. In his season in Chicago, Samuelsson recorded 22 assists in 54 games and was an East Division All-Star.

He competed in the 2009 IIHF World U18 Championships and won the gold medal with Team USA. After playing only one season of junior hockey, Samuelsson began playing college hockey with Boston College in 2009. He helped the Boston College Eagles to the 2010 NCAA Tournament title in his freshman year.

Philip made his NHL debut with the Pittsburgh Penguins on December 16, 2013. On December 5, 2014 Samuelsson was traded to the Arizona Coyotes for Rob Klinkhammer and a conditional fifth round pick of the 2016 NHL Entry Draft.

Following the 2014–15 NHL season Samuelsson became a restricted free agent under the NHL Collective Bargaining Agreement. The Arizona Coyotes  made him a qualifying offer to retain his NHL rights and, on July 5, 2015, Samuelsson filed for Salary Arbitration.

On July 2, 2016, Samuelsson agreed as a free agent to a one-year, two-way contract with the Montreal Canadiens. He was assigned to AHL affiliate, the St. John's IceCaps to begin the 2016–17 season. In 40 games with the IceCaps, Samuelsson posted only 5 points from the blueline before he was traded by the Canadiens to the Carolina Hurricanes in exchange for defenseman Keegan Lowe on February 21, 2017. His father, Ulf, is currently an assistant coach with the Chicago Blackhawks.

On October 4, 2018, Samuelsson signed a one-year contract with the Lehigh Valley Phantoms.

Career statistics

Regular season and playoffs

International

References

External links

1991 births
American men's ice hockey defensemen
American people of Swedish descent
Arizona Coyotes players
Avon Old Farms alumni
Boston College Eagles men's ice hockey players
Charlotte Checkers (2010–) players
Chicago Steel players
Fischtown Pinguins players
Ice hockey people from Scottsdale, Arizona
IK Oskarshamn players
Lehigh Valley Phantoms players
Leksands IF players
Living people
Stadion Hradec Králové players
People from Leksand Municipality
Pittsburgh Penguins draft picks
Pittsburgh Penguins players
Portland Pirates players
Springfield Falcons players
St. John's IceCaps players
Swedish ice hockey defencemen
USA Hockey National Team Development Program players
Wheeling Nailers players
Wilkes-Barre/Scranton Penguins players
Sportspeople from Dalarna County
American expatriate ice hockey players in Germany
Swedish expatriate ice hockey players in Germany
Swedish expatriate ice hockey players in Canada
American expatriate ice hockey players in the Czech Republic
American expatriate ice hockey players in Canada